Hog's Hole is a  biological Site of Special Scientific Interest in the civil parish of Combe in the English county of Berkshire.

Geography
Hog's Hole is one of three nationally important chalk grassland sites that lie within the North Wessex Downs along with Rushmore and Conholt Downs (SSSI) and part of Inkpen and Walbury Hills (SSSI).

Hog's Hole consists of a dry valley, or combe, cut in the Middle and Upper Chalk. The steep east and west-facing valley sides support only thin rendzina soils, an unusual feature being lines of bare chalk and flint scree. The valley opens out in its southern part, the remainder of the site consisting of a moderately steep and undulating south-facing slope and a steep west-facing slope rising to a plateau area.

History

The site has been predominantly used for grazing sheep.

Fauna

The site has the following Fauna:

Birds

Willow warbler
Garden warbler
Lesser whitethroat
Long-tailed tit
Yellowhammer

Flora

The site has the following Flora:

Trees

Crataegus
elder
Ligustrum vulgare
Prunus spinosa
Sycamore
Malus
Viburnum lantana
Ash
Whitebeam

Plants

References

Sites of Special Scientific Interest in Berkshire